Elysium Space is a space burial company. Burial options the company offers are Earth-orbit and then reentry burnup, and delivery to the lunar surface.  The company was the first to offer burial on the Moon.

History
Elysium Space was founded by Thomas Civeit in 2013.

In 2015, a launch aboard a USAF Super Strypi rocket failed to reach orbit. The remains will be reflown in the second launch. The remains were to have orbited for 2 years before reentering and going out in a blaze.

It will offer a service to launch the ashes of dead people into space aboard a SpaceX Falcon 9 rocket that will launch from Vandenberg Air Force Base in California, United States. This rocket rideshare will launch ashes into a Sun-synchronous orbit about the Earth. The Earth orbiting ashes will eventually have its orbit decay and return to Earth as a shooting star.

Memorial spacecraft
Elysium Space launches the cremated remains aboard their Elysium Star space mausoleum satellites, a series of 1U cubesats. The Earth-orbiting satellites are designed to remain in space for 2 years before orbital decay brings them back to Earth as a shooting star, burning up in a blazing reentry.

Elysium Space plans to use Astrobotic's Peregrine lunar lander for their lunar mausoleums.

Elysium Space is in the early stages of planning for deep-space burials.

Missions

 Lunar missions are yet to be scheduled
 Extrasolar missions are yet to be scheduled

See also
 Celestis, another space burial company

References

External links
 

American companies established in 2013
Private spaceflight companies
Space burials
Funeral-related industry